The 2019–20 Radford Highlanders men's basketball team represented Radford University in the 2019–20 NCAA Division I men's basketball season. The Highlanders, led by ninth-year head coach Mike Jones, played their home games at the Dedmon Center in Radford, Virginia, as members of the Big South Conference. They finished the season 21–11, 15–3 in Big South play to win a share of the regular season championship. They defeated Charleston Southern in quarterfinals of the Big South tournament before losing in the semifinals to Hampton. As a regular season conference champion, and No. 1 seed in their conference tournament, who failed to win their conference tournament, they received and automatic bid to the NIT. However, the NIT, and all other postseason tournaments, were cancelled amid the COVID-19 pandemic.

Previous season
The Highlanders finished the 2018–19 season 22–11 overall, 12–4 in Big South play to finish as regular season co-champions, alongside Campbell. In the Big South tournament, they defeated Presbyterian in the quarterfinals, Charleston Southern in the semifinals, before falling to Gardner–Webb in the championship game.

Roster

Schedule and results

|-
!colspan=12 style=| Exhibition

|-
!colspan=12 style=| Non-conference regular season

|-
!colspan=9 style=| Big South Conference regular season

|-
!colspan=12 style=| Big South tournament
|-

|-

Source

References

Radford Highlanders men's basketball seasons
Radford Highlanders
Presbyterian Blue Hose men's basketball
Presbyterian Blue Hose men's basketball